Fujica is the name given by Fujifilm of Japan to its line of still-photography and motion picture cameras.

History 
The company was founded on January 20, 1934 as Fuji Shashin Film K.K. (富士写真フィルム㈱, later translated as Fuji Photo Film Co., Ltd.), producing several sorts of film. It was an offshoot of Dai-Nippon Celluloid K.K. (大日本セルロイド㈱), founded in 1919. The company's first CEO was Asano Shūichi (浅野修一). The plants were located in the village of Minami-Ashigara (南足柄村, now a city) in the prefecture of Kanagawa (神奈川県), at the foot of Mt. Hakone (箱根山). It is said that the name "Fuji" (富士) was chosen by Asano Shūichi because of Mt. Fuji (富士山), situated not far from Mt. Hakone, but was already registered by a third party, to which the rights were bought for ¥8,000, a large sum at the time.

The company started to produce optical glass during the early 1940s for military use. The dependent company Fuji Shashin Kōki K.K. (富士写真光機㈱, meaning "Fuji Photo Optical Co., Ltd.") was founded in 1944, from the assets of Enomoto Kōgaku Seiki Seisakusho (榎本光学精機製作所), but this was absorbed back into Fuji Shashin Film after 1945. Many other Fuji companies were created after the war, all of them dependent of the main Fuji Shashin Film company and eventually of the Fujifilm Group (富士フィルムグループ). Fuji began producing cameras in 1948 with the Fujica Six. Until the late 1970s, many cameras made by Fuji were called Fujica, a contraction of Fuji and camera (cf Leica, Yashica etc.).

Fujifilm started producing digital cameras in 1988. Fujifilm was the most agile among film makers in adapting to digital imaging. Today they make digital APS-C and medium format mirrorless interchangeable-lens cameras and fixed lens compact cameras as well, all under the Fujifilm name.

Camera models 
Here is a list of all the Fujica branded still photo cameras that were produced and their date of introduction. Single-8 Film cameras are not listed.

 Fujica AX-Multi Program 1985
 Fujica STX-2 	1985 			
 Fujica AX-1N 	1984 	
 Fujica STX-1N 1983

 Fujica AX-1 	1980 			
 Fujica AX-3 	1980 			
 Fujica AX-5 	1980 		
 Fujica STX-1 	1979
 Flash Fujica II 1978
 Fujica AZ-1 	1978 	

 Fujica ST 605N 	1978 			
 Fujica ST 705W 	1978 			
 Fujica ST 705 	1977 			
 Fujica ST 601 	1976 			
 Fujica ST 605 	1976 		
 Fujica ST-F1975 			
 Fujica GEr 	1974 			
 Fujica ST 901 	1974 			
Fujica ST 801 	1973

 Fujica ST 701 	1971 			
 Fujica Compact Deluxe 	1967 			
 Fujica Drive 	1964 			
 Fujica V 2 	1964 			
 Fujicarex II 	1963 			
 Fujica 35 Auto-M 	1962
 Fujicarex 	1962 			
 Fujica 35 EE 	1961 		
 Fujica 35 SE 	1960 			
 Fujica 35 ML 	1958 			
 Fujica 35 M 	1957 			
 Fujicaflex 	1954 			
 Fujica Six II BS 	1950 			
 Fujica Six I BS 	1948

Lenses

Interchangeable lenses for 35mm cameras 
 Fuji Photo Film X-FUJINON (F2.2/55mm)
 Fuji lenses for Leica and Nikon

See also 
 Fuji GX680

References 
 Ars Camera Advertisements by Fuji Shashin Film in January 1946 (p. 34)
 March 1946 (p. 42).
 Koyasu Yoshinobu (子安栄信). "Fuji Shashin Firumu ryakushi" (富士写真フィルム略史, Short history of Fuji Photo Film). In Kamera Rebyū: Kurashikku Kamera Senka (カメラレビュー クラシックカメラ専科) / Camera Review: All about Historical Cameras no.44, December 1997. .
 Tokushū: Fuji Shashin Firumu no kamera(特集：富士写真フィルムのカメラ, special issue on the cameras of Fuji Photo Film). Pp. 11–7.
 Fujifilm history, vol.1, chapter 4.
 Fujifilm history, vol.1, chapter 1.
 Fujifilm history, vol.1, chapter 4.
 Fujifilm history, vol.1, chapter 10.

External links 

 Fuji 645 Camera Guide
 Fuji Company History
 Fuji 6x7 and 6x9 Camera Guide

Fujifilm cameras